Rich Youngin is the second studio album by American rapper Stunna 4 Vegas. It was released on January 17, 2020, by Billion Dollar Baby Entertainment and Interscope Records. It features guest appearances from DaBaby, Lil Baby, Blac Youngsta and Offset. The album peaked at number 29 on the Billboard 200.

Track listing

Charts

References

2020 albums
Stunna 4 Vegas albums
Interscope Records albums